Captain Suresh Biswas (1861 – 22 September 1905) was a famous 19th-century adventurer from India.

Life
Suresh Biswas was born in 1861 in Nathpur, Krishnaganj CD block) in Nadia district in West Bengal. He ran away from home as a teen and worked as a timber camp care taker in the Taungoo forest for a while. Biswas had travelled to England as a stowaway at age fifteen. After he arrived in England he drifted through several occupations, before becoming an animal trainer in a circus in Kent. He travelled with the circus to Hamburg.
After that, he migrated to Brazil (probably one of the first Indians to do so), and fought valiantly in the  Brazilian army (late 19th century).
Biswas himself was a fan of literature. He was made a Lieutenant in the army (and a Captain too, later). In spite of showing remarkable courage during the upsurge of rebellion he was not properly felicitated simply because of racial discrimination (he was after all a non white Hindu Asiatic in the white dominated catholic Brazil). He is often mistakenly mentioned as Col. Suresh Biswas. He was made Captain, not a Colonel in the Brazilian Army.

Colonel Biswas however settled down in Brazil as he was enchanted by the natural beauty of the country. He died there in 1905. He was buried in Cemitério São João Batista, Rio de Janeiro, but the tomb was destroyed by the authorities in 1911, just six years after his death.

Trivia
Not too many written records remain of the legendary adventurer, but he was mentioned in Satyajit Ray's novel "Chhinnamastar Abhishap" (Trans: The Curse of the Goddess), featuring the famous fictional detective, Feluda and also in "Du Chakay Duniya" by first Indian globe trotter Bimal Mukherjee.

Famous Bengali Comics strip creator Mayukh Chowdhury created a Bengali comics named 'Bangadesher Ranga' on him featuring him in the midst of the jungles in Brazil.

Colonel Suresh Biswas's name was also referred in the short story "Biswas Moshai" by Banaful (Balai Chand Mukhopadhyay).
Also he was mentioned in famous writer Hemendra Kumar Roy's story "Surjo Nogorir Gupotodhon",which belongs to Hemendra Kumar's famous Bimal-Kumar series.

Suresh Biswas is also mentioned in Subhas Chandra Bose autobiography.

External links

 A Life of Mythic Proportions - Mid-Day

References

The Self-Image of Effeteness: Physical Education and Nationalism in Nineteenth-Century Bengal by John Rosselli, Past and Present, No. 86 (Feb., 1980)
"The Effeminate and the Masculine: Nationalism and the Concept of race in Colonial Bengal" by Indira Chowdhury-Sengupta from The Concept of Race in South Asia edited by Peter Robb, 1995 Oxford Press
Upendra Krishna Banerji, Karnel Suresh Bishvas, (1900; second edition, Calcutta 1909-10) - biography of Colonel Suresh Biswas

1861 births
1905 deaths
Indian explorers
Brazilian people of Indian descent
Lion tamers
People from Nadia district